The 2017–18 National Basketball League (Bulgaria) season was the 77th season of the Bulgarian NBL. The season started on October 7, 2017 and ended on May 29, 2018.

Teams

The same nine teams of the previous season repeated participation in the 2017–18 season.

Regular season
In the regular season, teams play against each other three times home-and-away in a double round-robin format. The eight first qualified teams advance to the playoffs.

League table

Results

First stage

Second stage
Home and away games depend on table after the first stage.

Playoffs

Player of the round

NBL clubs in European competitions

NBL clubs in regional competitions

References

External links
NBL official website 
Player Stats

National Basketball League (Bulgaria) seasons
Bulgarian
Basketball